Frolovskoye is a rural locality (a selo) in Krasnoselskoye Rural Settlement, Yuryev-Polsky District, Vladimir Oblast, Russia. The population was 148 as of 2010.

Geography 
Frolovskoye is located 12 km west of Yuryev-Polsky (the district's administrative centre) by road. Yelokh is the nearest rural locality.

References 

Rural localities in Yuryev-Polsky District